The A27 is a major road in England. It runs from its junction with the A36 at Whiteparish (near Salisbury) in the county of Wiltshire, follows the south coast of Hampshire and West Sussex, and terminates at Pevensey (near Eastbourne and Bexhill) in East Sussex.

It is the westernmost road in Zone 2 in the UK road numbering system.

Between Portsmouth and Lewes, it is one of the busiest trunk roads in the UK.

History
Historically, for longer distance movement along the south coast, the M25 in combination with the M2, M20, M23 / A23, A3 / A3(M) and M3 has provided an attractive alternative to the actual south coast route of A259, A27 and M27. In 2002 an offpeak journey between Margate and Southampton via the M25 took 2 hours 30 minutes, and via the coastal route using the A259, A27 and M27 took 3 hours 50 minutes. The reason the coastal route is so much slower than the M25 alternative is largely due to a series of bottlenecks on the A27. These include Chichester, Arundel, Worthing and Polegate.

The British government announced, in its 2013 spending review, that it would go ahead with improvements to the Chichester bypass. The Highways Agency said that the proposals would be subject to public consultation in July 2015. The preferred route would then be announced in September 2015 and the plan would be to start construction in February 2018 with a completion date of December 2019. However the timescales were then revised. There was a six-week public consultation period during Spring 2016. The proposed construction would then commence in March 2019 with a completion date of March 2021. After five options were published and two dropped the government cancelled the whole project on 28 February 2017, citing lack of support from local authorities as the main reason. Chichester Bypass is now scheduled to be included in "RP3".
A proposed scheme to bypass Lancing and Sompting (as well as other sections) was dropped in 1988.

A proposed scheme to bypass Arundel was dropped in 2003, although the junction at the end of the dual carriageway has been partly made into an underpass. However, the scheme was relaunched in Spring 2018 when Highways England announced their preferred route, choosing a "a modified version of Option 5A". Although the document claims 48% of respondents support this option, there are worries that the new road may damage ancient woodland in the South Downs National Park. It is due to be put before the planning inspectorate in 2022; if successful, construction will begin in  2023-2024 and it would be open in 2025–2030.

At Worthing, where the possibility of a bypass has often been discussed since 1967, even getting as far as passing the inspector's report at a public inquiry, the plan was dropped in 1996 following rising costs. Arundel and Worthing are both areas of known traffic congestion during times of peak usage. Improvements at Worthing and Lancing are now committed under RP2.

A bridge over the level crossing at Beddingham was completed on 22 August 2008. The original proposal called for a dual carriageway standard link with a bridge over the crossing. However, the actual project involved improving the original single carriageway road by providing two lanes westbound and one lane eastbound between the Southerham and Beddingham roundabouts. More works are taking place in 2019-2021 between Beddingham and Polegate to improve the safety at junctions and provide an off-carriageway cycle track for the entire length. Lewes-Polegate has been included in RP3  for a new offline limited access route.

Despite the limited improvements to the A27, it is still substantially quicker (usually more than an hour difference) to travel from Southampton to Margate via the M25 route compared to the coast route of A259, A27 and M27.

Because of all the delays along its route, according to West Sussex County Council, the A27 is the most unreliable all-purpose trunk road in England.
Further, it is widely considered by businesses on the coast to cost money and inhibit economic performance due to its unreliability and frequent congestion.

Highways England commissioned a report by "Transport Focus" to undertake road user priorities.  The South Central route, that is largely the A27, was one of the lower rated routes with 50% of users experiencing problems. Out of a list of strategic routes across the whole of England only two were rated worse than the South Central route: the M25 to Solent route (61%) and the London Orbital and M23 to Gatwick (58%). Further Highways England identified the A27 between Lancing and the A24; between Arundel and the A284; between the A23 and Polegate; also around Chichester as being some of worst performing links in the country for safety issues. One accident victim was Actor Desmond Llewelyn, who portrayed Q in a large portion of the James Bond film series and was fatally injured in a car accident on the A27 in 1999, at Firle, on the A23 to Polegate section.

There are several sections of the A27 that fall inside the Highways Agency nationwide top 250 collision rankings:

 A27 between Shoreham-by-Sea and Southwick – ranking 123 
 A27/A23 junction Brighton – ranking 158 
 A27 near the junction with the A2025 near Lancing – ranking 158 
 A27 Chichester By-Pass east of the city – ranking 202

Shoreham Airshow crash

At the Shoreham Airshow on 22 August 2015, a Hawker Hunter crashed into the A27, striking several vehicles and killing eleven people. The road was completely closed for eight days and did not fully reopen until 16 September 2015.

Description

The road starts at its junction with the A36 at Whiteparish. It runs through Romsey, Chilworth, at which point it follows a Roman Road, Swaythling, West End and Bursledon.  It then closely parallels the south coast and travels on via Fareham, Cosham, Havant, Chichester, Arundel, Worthing, Lancing, Shoreham-by-Sea, Hove, Brighton, Falmer, Lewes and Polegate where it then terminates at Pevensey in East Sussex.

A section of the A27 running from the eastern end of the M27 to the end of the road at Pevensey forms part of, what was known as, the South Coast Trunk Road. Much of the road has been improved to dual carriageway standard, with the westernmost section of the trunk portion even having as much as four lanes plus a hard shoulder in each direction, and on a motorway alignment with grade-separated junctions. This is perhaps a reflection that the M27 was once proposed to run as far as Chichester.

The road runs east from Portsmouth to Havant then on to the Warblington/ Emsworth exit. Beyond Warblington the dual carriageway east has no junctions in it until it reaches Chichester, where the by-pass has five roundabouts and one traffic signal controlled junction, that disrupt the mainline flow of the road. The Chichester by-pass is regularly subject to congestion and although a public inquiry has proposed improvements, those improvements are currently on hold.

East of Chichester the road largely retains a two-lane dual-carriageway standard. There are, however a couple of sections of single-carriageway; at Arundel and at Worthing. These are both areas of known traffic congestion during times of peak usage.

At the junction of the A27 and the A24, the A27 has a brief section where the road is designated 'A27' and 'A24' before continuing from the 'Grove Lodge' roundabout where the road is named "Upper Brighton Road".
After Worthing, the A27 passes Sompting on the Sompting Bypass before passing through Lancing where there are traffic lights and a roundabout which disrupt traffic flow. Just before the road crosses the River Adur near Shoreham via the 'Shoreham flyover' (constructed 1968-70), there is a traffic light-controlled intersection close to Lancing College and the headquarters of Ricardo plc which was the scene of the multiple-fatality Shoreham Airshow crash in 2015. After the 'flyover' over the Adur, the A27 then runs past the Holmbush interchange (Shoreham-by-Sea) and on through the Southwick Hill Tunnel, at that point entering the City of Brighton and Hove, traditionally (though no longer administratively) part of East Sussex.

Later, it passes Brighton — where it is known as the Brighton Bypass — and around the South Downs. The junction of the A23 and the A27 is often slow in the morning rush hour.

It then passes around Falmer with this section of road having three lanes in each direction but loses the third lane later. When Brighton and Hove Albion play at home this section can become congested due to its proximity to Falmer Stadium. The road passes into East Sussex proper just to the west of the Falmer junction.

Afterwards, it passes south of Lewes where it meets the A26 road to Newhaven.

Here, the road becomes a single carriageway standard and formerly crossed a level crossing until it was bypassed by a bridge which opened in 2008. The South Coast Multi-Modal Study (SoCoMMS) recommended a dual carriageway, but the Highways Agency built it to a cheaper single-carriageway standard. Plans are still proposed for upgrading this later.

The road afterwards reverts to a dual carriageway with access to the A22, which provides links to Eastbourne and Hailsham.

The road then once again becomes a single carriageway near Pevensey, where the road ends, and the South Coast Trunk Road transfers over to the A259; this coast road starts in Emsworth and shadows the route of the A27.

Bexhill to Hastings link road

Work on the contentious Bexhill to Hastings link road commenced in early 2013 and was completed in late 2015. The road provides a more direct link from the A27 to the A28 road via the A259 road.

Landmarks on the route

 Spinnaker Tower
 Chichester Cathedral
 Arundel Cathedral
 Arundel Castle
 The South Downs
 Shoreham Airport
 River Adur
 Lancing College
 University of Sussex
 Lewes Castle
 Mount Caburn
 Firle Beacon
 Long Man of Wilmington
 Falmer Stadium

Proposed developments
The National Highways Agency state on their website that the A27 is the only east–west trunk road south of the M25 and it serves a population of more than 750,000 people along the south coast. They also say that safety is a problem along the A27 with many accidents and incidents along its length.  To improve its safety and serviceability they intend to make improvements to the road. This includes:
 Arundel Bypass RP1/2 (2015-2025), The consultation period has closed. National Highways say that they will submit a planning application in 2022, with a decision to be made by the Secretary of State between 2023 and 2024.
 Worthing & Lancing Improvements RP1/2 (2015-2025), improvements to junctions in the urban areas of Worthing and Lancing to increase capacity and improve safety.
 Lewes - Polegate RP3 (2025-2030) There is also a recommendation to make the road a dual carriageway on an offline route.
 Chichester Bypass RP3 (2025-2030) Chichester Bypass is on the shortlist of projects likely for RP3. The National Highways Agency intend to hold a comprehensive public engagement programme in 2023, where people will be encouraged to have their say.

Incidents
 In November 2022, during the outbreak of flooding, the road near Chichester, Emsworth and Havant was extensively covered with floodwater. 20 cars were trapped on this section of the road.

Junctions 
{| class="plainrowheaders wikitable"
|-
!scope=col|County
!scope=col|Location
!scope=col|mi
!scope=col|km
!scope=col|Coord
!scope=col|Destinations
!scope=col|Notes
|-
|Wiltshire 
|—
|0
|0
|
| - Southampton, Salisbury
|
|-
|rowspan="20"|Hampshire
|rowspan="2"|Romsey
|8.5
|13.7
|
| - Bournemouth, Ringwood, Southampton, Ower, Cadnam, Romsey, Winchester
|
|-
|9.3
|15.0
|
| - Winchester, Stockbridge
|
|-
|—
|10.3
|16.6
|
| - Southampton, Nursling, Rownhams, Lordshill
|
|-
| rowspan="4" |Southampton
|15.1
|24.3
|
| - Southampton
 M3 - London, Eastleigh, Winchester
|
|-
|16.6
|26.7
| bgcolor="ffdddd" |
| bgcolor="ffdddd" | - Eastleigh, Southampton Center
| bgcolor="ffdddd" |You need to take a detour along Stoneham lane and the A335 to continue along the A27
|-
|19.9
|32.1
|
| - Southampton, Bitterne, Botley, Hedge End
|
|-
|21.2
|34.2
|
| - Portsmouth, Southampton, Bitterne
 - Woolston
|
|-
| rowspan="5" |Park Gate 
|24.5
|39.4
|
| - Botley
|
|-
|24.8
|39.9
|
| - Fareham, Titchfield, Warsash
|Road splits into two branches
|-
| colspan="5"  bgcolor="d3d3d3" align="center"|North branch
|-
|25.2
|40.6
|
| - Southampton, Winchester, Portsmouth, Fareham
|
|-
| colspan="5"  bgcolor="d3d3d3" align="center"|South branch
|-
| rowspan="5" |Fareham
|29.1
|46.8
|
| - Gosport
|
|-
|29.7
|47.3
|
| - Alton, Wickham
|Road splits into two branches
|-
| colspan="5"  bgcolor="d3d3d3" align="center"|North branch
|-
|30.3
|48.3
|
| - Southampton, Alton, Portsmouth, Brighton
|
|-
| colspan="5"  bgcolor="d3d3d3" align="center"|East branch
|-
| rowspan="3" |Portsmouth
|33.3
|53.1
|
| - Portsmouth, Southampton
 - Cosham, Paulsgrove, Waterlooville
|
|-
|34.3
|54.6
| bgcolor="ffdddd" |
| bgcolor="ffdddd" | - Portsmouth, Southampton, Fareham
 - Hilsea
 - Cosham, Waterlooville
| bgcolor="ffdddd" |no access from M27 to A27 going west and vice versa
|-
|35.6
|57.3
|
| - Farlington, Drayton, Portsmouth, Southsea, Fratton, Hilsea
|
|-

*Ceremonial Counties
Coordinate list

Notes

External links

 Society for All British Road Enthusiasts Route Description - A27
 TAB-MSAS: Roads Photos: A27
 BBC News article on new subway at Falmer
 BBC News article on speed trap at Falmer
 Traffic delays on the A27
 Highways Agency A27 projects page

References

Roads in East Sussex
Roads in Hampshire
Roads in West Sussex
Roads in Wiltshire
Roads in England